Martín Cortés el Mestizo (c. 1522 – c. 1595) was the first-born son of  Hernán Cortés and La Malinche (doña Marina), the conquistador's indigenous interpreter and concubine. He is considered to be one of the first mestizos of New Spain and is known as “El Mestizo.” His exact date of birth is not precisely known. Until the birth of Martín's younger brother, don Martín Cortés Zúñiga, to his father and his aristocratic second wife, Martín, son of La Malinche, was Cortés's only male heir, despite his illegitimate birth. He was recognized by his father, and was legitimized in 1529 by a bull of Pope Clement VII (along with his siblings Catalina and Luis). Cortés's first marriage to Catalina Suárez was childless. Martín Cortés grew up in Spain but returned to the New World as a young man. He received a first level education and became Knight of the Order of Santiago, the highest status that could be achieved in Spain. During a time he became the page of Philip II of Spain. He accompanied Philip II to Flanders, to England and in the battle of San Quentin. In 1562 the king left all the towns and properties granted to his father. As heirs of Cortés, he and his brother were considered a threat to the vice-regal rule, and they were accused of participating in a plot to overthrow the viceroy. He was arrested and tortured and exiled to Spain, where they were exonerated in 1574. He lived there the rest of his life until his death.

Early life 
Martín Cortés was born in 1522 in a former Aztec palace in “New Spain,” now Mexico City, Mexico. His father, conquistador Hernán Cortés, and his mother, Malintzin, Cortés's guide, interpreter, and companion, named him Martín after the Roman god of war and Cortés's father. When Martin was only two years old his mother and father left him in the care of Juan Altamirano, Cortés's cousin, to go on an expedition to Honduras.
During the expedition Malinche was wed to another Spaniard by the name of Juan Jaramillo and never again lived with Martín. Hernán thought it was best for Martín to continue to live with Altamirano since that was the home that he had known. When Martín was 6 years old he moved with Cortés to Spain.

Growing up in Spain
In May 1528, Martín arrived in the harbor of Palos de la Frontera. Cortés was still relatively unknown and did not receive the welcome that one might expect someone of his historical importance to receive. In June 1528, Cortés took Martin on his journey to meet the emperor, Charles V. This proved to be a difficult task however. According to a letter written two years after this meeting, Cortés writes, "After I kissed your majesty's hands in Barcelona," which implies that Cortés met the king in Barcelona. In 1529, Hernán Cortés hired a lawyer to petition Pope Clement VII to legitimize Martín. The pope agreed since he himself had been illegitimate. Martín spent most of his adolescence at the royal court. His exact time spent there is debatable. However, according to letters at the royal court's archives from Martín's tutor, he was still living there in September 1530. After spending time studying at the royal court, Martín became a page under Philip II of Spain in 1537.

The other brother, Don Martín Cortés
In 1532, Hernán Cortés had another son, this time with his aristocratic second wife, Spanish aristocrat, Doña Juana de Zúñiga. He also named this son Martín after his father, but this son had the aristocratic title of don, a marker that anyone holding it kept from cradle to grave. In October of the same year his half-brother Don Martín was born, Martín fell ill. According to letters between Hernán Cortés and his cousin, Francisco de Núñez, he was suffering from lamparones, a disease that was called "the king’s evil" because some thought that the king could cure it. This is a form of tuberculosis known as "scrofula"; however, not many people commonly suffer from it. In the spring of 1540, Cortés returned to Spain for the last time; this was the first time that Martín Cortés, son of Malinche, and Don Martín Cortés met. In 1541, Cortés was knighted into the Order of Santiago, and fought to gain Algiers for Charles V. In April 1547, Cortés fought in the Battle of Muhlberg in Germany.

Death of Hernán Cortés and adulthood in Spain
Hernán Cortés died in Castile, Spain on December 2, 1547. Although Martín Cortés, son of Malinche, was his first-born son, his primary heir was his legitimate son, Don Martín Cortés, who succeeded to the title of the Marquis of the Valley of Oaxaca. Three years later, in 1550, when Martín was twenty-eight, he spent a year in Europe fighting in the armies of the Holy Roman Emperor. In 1557, Martín Cortés hired a lawyer to sue his brother for certain mines and slaves that were supposedly granted to him by his father 8 years before his death. This was a battle that went on for several years. However, during the process of this battle, Spain passed the New Laws that said that every slave in New Spain was free.

Return to Mexico
In September 1562, after a terrible voyage, Martín Cortés arrived into the port of San Francisco de Campeche. At the end of January 1562, Cortés and his two half brothers, the other Martín Cortés and Luis Cortés, sailed toward Vera Cruz, the city their father had founded a mere 44 years prior. By February, the Cortés brothers had reached their parents' former home and the birthplace of Martín Cortés, son of Malinche, Tenochtitlán. Being the heir of Hernán Cortés, Don Martín Cortés Zuñiga (the legitimate son, not the son of Malinche) was now the Marquis of the Valley of Oaxaca.

In 1566, news arrived to Mexico that the leyes de encomienda or encomienda laws that changed the encomienda system that said at the death of the encomendero, all his properties would belong to the government and not the family of the deceased. In March 1566, Brothers Gil and Alonso de Ávila held a party at their home in Mexico. This was the spot where what would become known as the "marquis plot" supposedly occurred. The brothers had dressed as Mexican chieftains and paid homage to someone dressed as Hernán Cortés. To the Cortés brothers and their friends, this was simply a charade. However, the Spanish court in New Spain saw it as their attempt to overthrow them.

The Real Hacienda denounced the acts to the Viceroy as a direct attack upon King Philip II, and the conspirators were arrested. Amongst those arrested were Cortés's three sons. Several members of the conspiracy were executed. A few days later, the Viceroy Gastón de Peralta intervened directly and released Cortés's three sons.

On July 16, 1566, guards came to arrest Martín Cortés and bring him to the royal houses. He learned that his brothers, the Ávila brothers, and eighteen other friends had been taken prisoner too. They were being charged with plotting to anoint the marqués, his brother Don Martín, as the king of New Spain. He was brought before the judge on the day of his arrest, three days after having been questioned, he sent the judge a petition asking him to either charge him with something or let him go, but nothing happened. Six days later, he tried again, and once again, nothing happened. Finally, thirteen days later, he was charged with having known for ten or eleven months that his brother and other people in his close circle were charged with planning a rebellion and uprising against His Majesty. Alfonso de Ávila and his brother were both publicly beheaded, and in September 1566, the first Cortés brother, Luis, was sentenced to death by beheading.

However, before this could happen, a new viceroy, the Marqués de Falces, arrived in Vera Cruz on November 15, 1567. He allowed both of Martín's brothers to leave New Spain and for Luis to go serve time in a colony near Algeria while Martin was allowed to plead his case before the king. However, Martín, Malinche's son, stayed in Mexico.

On January 7, 1568, Martín was subjected to torture and was sentenced to indefinite exile in Spain. His torturer was reproached by King Philip II personally, sent back to Spain, and found dead in his room one day after having met with the king. After being exiled from his father's land and his birthplace, he joined the forces of Don Juan, who was Charles V's son, in the Rebellion of the Alpujarras sometime between 1569 and 1570. In 1574, the king offered condolences to the children of Hernán Cortés and they were all exonerated of any wrongdoing.

Legacy
Martín was married to Doña Bernaldina de Porras. They had two children: a daughter, Ana Cortés, and a son, Fernando Cortés. Details and dates of Martín's family life do not exist. It is also not entirely clear when Martín died. He died in Spain sometime before the turn of the seventeenth century; 1595 has been mentioned as a possible date.

See also
Hernán Cortés
Martín Cortés, 2nd Marqués del Valle de Oaxaca

References

16th-century Mexican people
Mestizo people
Nahua nobility
Knights of Santiago
1522 births
Year of death missing
Nobility of the Americas